Heaton, Butler and Bayne were a British firm who produced stained-glass windows from 1862 to 1953.

History
Clement Heaton (1824–82) founded his own stained glass firm in 1852, joined by James Butler in 1855. Between 1859 and 1861 they worked alongside Clayton and Bell and were joined by Robert Turnill Bayne (1837–1915), who became their sole designer and a full partner in the firm in 1862.  The firm was known as Heaton, Butler and Bayne from 1862.

His windows show strong design and colour, and are often recognisable by the inclusion of at least one figure with Bayne's features and long beard. They established their studio in Covent Garden, London, and went on to become one of the leading firms of Gothic Revival stained glass manufacturers, whose work was commissioned by the principal Victorian architects. A change in direction came with their production of windows to the designs of Henry Holiday in 1868, which show a more classical influence at work. During a long career, the firm produced stained glass for numerous churches throughout the Britain and the Empire, as well as the United States.

Westminster Abbey includes a Heaton, Butler and Bayne window, installed in 1868, an early example of the work of Henry Holiday. Also the stained glass in the east window of the Parish Church of St Mary Magdalene, Gillingham. Other windows by this firm are in Wimborne Minster 1857, Peterborough Cathedral 1864 and St Mary's Parish Church, Hampton c1888.
A documentary film, Stained Glass Masters: Heaton, Butler and Bayne, was produced in 2000 by  the film maker Karl Krogstad. The documentary was narrated by Edgar Award winning author Burl Barer.

Selected works

England
 St Mary's Church, Banbury
 Tewkesbury Abbey, Tewkesbury, Gloucestershire (Adoration of the Magi, 1869)
 St. Lawrence's Church, St Lawrence, Isle of Wight (Parable of the Sower)
 Church of St. Mary the Virgin, Staverton, Northamptonshire (Faith, Hope, and Charity, 1896)
 St. Peter's Church, Dunton, Norfolk
 St. Mary's Church, East Carleton, Norfolk (Saint Mary and Jesus Christ)
 St. James' Church, Hebden Bridge, West Yorkshire

Northern Ireland
 St. Eugene's Church, Newtownstewart, County Tyrone (Memorial to Rev. James McIvor, 1909)

Wales
 Drybridge House, Monmouth, Monmouthshire (Memorial Window to C. H. Crompton-Roberts, 1894)
 Church of St. Nicholas, Trellech, Monmouthshire

Canada
 Cathedral of the Holy Trinity, Quebec City, Quebec

France
 Royal Memorial Church of St George, Cannes, Alpes-Maritimes

Russia
 Church of the Savior on Blood, Saint Petersburg

Switzerland
 Fraumunster, Zurich, Canton of Zurich

United States
 St. Saviour's Church, Bar Harbor, Maine
 Calvary Episcopal Church, Pittsburgh, Pennsylvania
 St. Alban's Church, Philadelphia, Pennsylvania
 St. Matthew's Cathedral, Laramie, Wyoming

See also 
 Stained glass - British glass, 1811-1918

References

External links

"Stained glass masters"
Buckinghamshire Stained Glass

Heaton Butler and Bayne
Glassmaking companies of the United Kingdom
British companies established in 1855
Manufacturing companies established in 1855
1855 establishments in England